Lebetimonas is a genus of bacteria from the family Nautiliaceae.

References

Further reading 
 
 
 

Campylobacterota
Bacteria genera